Eatwell is a surname. Notable people with the surname include:

 Brian Eatwell (1939–2007), British art director
 John Eatwell, Baron Eatwell, (born 1945), British economist 
 Piu Eatwell (born 1970), British-Indian author
 Roger Eatwell, British academic

See also
 Eatwell plate, pictorial summary of the main food groups and their recommended proportions for a healthy diet